John W. Dunn (April 5, 1891 – April 7, 1975) was an American painter. His work was part of the painting event in the art competition at the 1932 Summer Olympics.

References

1891 births
1975 deaths
20th-century American painters
American male painters
Olympic competitors in art competitions
Painters from Washington, D.C.
20th-century American male artists